In the Maybe World is an album by folk musician Lisa Germano.  It was released in 2006 through Young God Records.

The album peaked at #3 on Billboard's Top New Age Albums in the summer of 2006, becoming her biggest chart hit in the US. "Red Thread" was a college radio hit.

Track listing
All songs written by Lisa Germano.
 "The Day"
 "Too Much Space"
 "Moon in Hell"
 "Golden Cities"
 "Into Oblivion"
 "In the Land of Fairies"
 "Wire"
 "In the Maybe World"
 "Red Thread"
 "A Seed"
 "Except for the Ghosts"
 "After Monday"

Personnel
Brady Michaels, Craig Ross, Johnny Marr - guitar
Sebastian Steinberg - bass
Joey Waronker - drums

References

Lisa Germano albums
2006 albums
Young God Records albums